Papà Pacifico is a 1954 Italian comedy film directed by Guido Brignone and starring Antonella Lualdi and Frank Latimore. It grossed 88 million lire at the Italian box office.

Plot

Cast 

 Antonella Lualdi as Luisella Ceccacci
 Frank Latimore as  Carlo Torquati
 Nando Bruno as  Augusto Ceccacci 
 Galeazzo Benti as Baron Alberto di Pontenero
 Bice Valori as  Gina 
 Carletto Sposito as The Toy Seller
  Lucia Brusco as  Maria Grazia
  Agostino Salvietti as  Raimondo Giorpani
 Nerio Bernardi as The Prosecutor
 Enzo Biliotti as  The Judge
  Marisa Valenti as  Mara Lauri
  Pino Locchi as  Fofò
  Angela Lavagna as Miss Giorpani
  Franco Andrei as  Pier Luigi Dodi 
  Cesarina Gheraldi as The Thief
  Nino Milano as  commissario
 Luisella Boni as  Donatella 
 Anita Durante as   Ponte Nero's Doorkeeper
 Ada Colangeli as Ceccacci's Doorkeeper
  Anna Di Leo as  Maria Teresa  
 Ciccio Barbi as  Carletto 
 Michele Malaspina as  The Car Vendor

References

External links

Italian comedy films
1954 comedy films
1954 films
Films directed by Guido Brignone
Italian black-and-white films
1950s Italian films